Mutual Film Company is an American film production company based in Hollywood, California. The company was initially founded by financer Gary Levinsohn in 1989 as Classico Entertainment, before combining with The Mark Gordon Company in 1995 to form Cloud Nine Entertainment. Mutual is a film financier that was involved in the co-production of feature films. Mutual notably co-produced and financed several feature films for Paramount Pictures and Universal Studios.

History

Classico Entertainment 
In 1989, following the shutdown of De Laurentiis Entertainment Group, Gary Levinsohn launched its own company Classico Entertainment and it served as a sales agent of Dino de Laurentiis Communications.

In 1994, Classico signed a deal with Atlas Entertainment, whereas Classico could finance films for the company.

Mutual Film Company 
In 1995, film producers Mark Gordon and Gary Levinsohn decided to merge their own companies into Cloud Nine Entertainment, a production company that would be involved in the co-production and financing of feature films. The company opened its office at Raleigh Studios on Melrose Avenue near the Paramount Pictures lot in Hollywood, California.

Following Cloud Nine's establishment, the company created an international sales division, and finalized a multi-year equity partnership with four companies — the United Kingdom's BBC, Germany's Tele-München, Japan's Toho-Towa/Marubeni and France's UGC-PH. These four companies financed 60% (15% each) of the films' budgets, in exchange for distribution rights in their respective territories and equity stakes in the films on a worldwide basis.

The company's first film under the new regime was 1997's The Relic.

Eighteen months after forming Cloud Nine, Gordon and Levinsohn renamed the company to Mutual Film Company. The new name was meant to reflect the joint venture and the profits it would share with its international investors.

Mutual notably financed films for Universal Studios and Paramount Pictures. On several occasions, films developed by Mutual, such as Saving Private Ryan (1998) and The Patriot (2000), were financed by major studios.

In 2000, three of Mutual's partners, Tele Munchen Gruppe, BBC, and Toho, negotiated with a banking consortium led by Union Bank of California and secured a $200 million revolving credit line that would allow Mutual to produce and finance films without approval from a major film studio. Lara Croft: Tomb Raider, released in 2001, became the second highest-grossing film produced by Mutual (after Saving Private Ryan), while its sequel, subtitled The Cradle of Life, underperformed. Mutual's investors left the company, citing the poor box office performances of the many films produced.

In September 2000, Gordon left Mutual to relaunch his own company, the Mark Gordon Company. Film producer Don Granger joined the company, working alongside Levinsohn.

Filmography
Mutual Film Company has produced 21 films. Of these, only two of them, Blue Ice and The Ripper were made-for-television productions. Note that in some cases the distributor or distributors are also co-producers. The box office column reflects the worldwide gross for the theatrical release of the films in United States dollars.

1 Released as a made-for-television film2 Uncredited

References

 
Mass media companies established in 1989
Film production companies of the United States